Charles A. Hautz  (February 5, 1852 – January 24, 1929) was an American professional baseball player who played first base for the 1875 St. Louis Red Stockings and the 1884 Pittsburgh Alleghenys.

External links

Baseball players from Missouri
St. Louis Red Stockings players
Pittsburgh Alleghenys players
19th-century baseball players
1852 births
1929 deaths
Major League Baseball first basemen